MTV's Amp is a 1997 electronic album produced by the late-night show, MTV's Amp. It features many of the bigger hits in America, including tracks from the Chemical Brothers and Crystal Method.

Track listing 
 "Block Rockin' Beats" by The Chemical Brothers - 5:00
 "Atom Bomb" by Fluke - 3:57
 "Pearl's Girl" by Underworld - 4:25
 "We Have Explosive" by The Future Sound of London - 6:22
 "Ni Ten Ichi Ryu" by Photek - 5:58
 "Girl/Boy Song" by Aphex Twin - 4:48
 "The Box" by Orbital - 4:15
 "We All Want To Be Free" by Tranquility Bass - 4:20
 "Inner City Life" by Goldie - 3:14
 "Voodoo People (Chemical Brothers remix)" by The Prodigy - 5:54
 "Are You There?" by Josh Wink - 3:58
 "Busy Child" by The Crystal Method - 4:07
 "Sick To Death" by Atari Teenage Riot - 3:39

References

Techno compilation albums
Electronic compilation albums
1997 compilation albums
Drum and bass albums
House music albums
Industrial compilation albums